The 2006 Women's Asian Games Volleyball Tournament was the 12th edition of the event, organized by the Asian governing body, the AVC in conjunction with the OCA. It was held in Doha, Qatar from November 30 to December 12, 2006.

Squads

Results
All times are Arabia Standard Time (UTC+03:00)

Preliminary

Pool A

|}

Pool B

|}

Final round

Quarterfinals

|}

Pos 5–8

|}

Semifinals

|}

Pos 7–8

|}

Pos 5–6

|}

Bronze medal match

|}

Gold medal match

|}

Final standing

References
Results

External links
Official website

Women